Baladiyat Al-Basra Sport Club, is an Iraqi football team based in Al-Saie, Basra, that plays in Iraq Division Three.

Managerial history
 Mohammed Abbas
 Mahmoud Yasser

Other games

Handball  
The Baladiyat Al-Basra handball team won the 2016–17 Iraq Handball's 1st Division title

See also
 2019–20 Iraq FA Cup
 2020–21 Iraq FA Cup

References

External links
 Baladiyat Al-Basra SC on Goalzz.com
 Iraq Clubs- Foundation Dates

Football clubs in Iraq
2013 establishments in Iraq
Association football clubs established in 2013
Football clubs in Basra
Basra